Patricia Louise Lowther (born Patricia Louise Tinmuth) (July 29, 1935 – September 24, 1975) was a Canadian poet. Born in Vancouver, British Columbia, she grew up in the neighboring city of North Vancouver.

Life
Lowther's first published poem appeared in The Vancouver Sun when she was ten years old. In 1968, she published her first collection, This Difficult Flowering, with Very Stone House, a small Canadian poetry press. In 1972, "The Age of the Bird", a long poem inspired by revolutionary politics in South America, was published as a broadside by Blackfish Press. Its companion poem, "Regard to Neruda", was written for Pablo Neruda, one of her political and literary inspirations.

Milk Stone, published in 1974 by Borealis Press, became Lowther's breakthrough into Canadian mainstream literature. A Stone Diary was submitted to Oxford University Press in 1975. Lowther was co-chair of the League of Canadian Poets, and the BC Arts Council. She was about to begin her first teaching term as a Creative Writing sessional at the University of British Columbia when she was murdered by her husband.

In September 1975, Lowther was reported missing after failing to arrive for a scheduled poetry reading at Vancouver's Ironworkers Hall. Three weeks later, her body was found in Furry Creek near Squamish, British Columbia. Roy Lowther, her second husband whom she had married in 1963, was convicted of her murder in June 1977. He died in Matsqui prison in Abbotsford, British Columbia, on July 14, 1985.

Lowther's daughters are the poet Christine Lowther, Beth Lowther, and Kathy Lyons (d. 2015). Her son is Alan Domphousse.

Legacy
Two years after Lowther's murder, Oxford University Press published A Stone Diary. In 1980, a collection of Lowther's early and unpublished poems, Final Instructions, was also published. Also that year, the League of Canadian Poets established the Pat Lowther Award, a prize awarded annually to a book of poetry by a Canadian woman.

A manuscript was discovered in 1996 and published under the title Time Capsule.

Lowther's life and death have served to inspire a number of works, including her daughter Christine Lowther's first poetry collection, New Power (1999), and the novels Swann: A Mystery (1987) by Carol Shields and Furry Creek by Keith Harrison (1999).

See also 
List of solved missing persons cases

Awards
 Canada Council grant

Bibliography
This Difficult Flowering, Very Stone House, Vancouver, 1968
The Age of the Bird - 1972
Milk Stone, Borealis Press, 1974
A Stone Diary, Oxford University Press, 1977

Critical studies

Christine Wiesenthal, ed. (2010.) The Collected Works of Pat Lowther. NeWest Press.

References

External links
"Pat Lowther", Canadian Poets, University of Toronto
"Pat Lowther", Canadian Women Poets, Brock University
"Pat Lowther", ABC Book World
"No Mind’s Eye, Pat Lowther, Jealousy"

1935 births
1970s missing person cases
1975 deaths
1975 murders in Canada
20th-century Canadian poets
20th-century Canadian women writers
Canadian murder victims
Canadian women poets
Female murder victims
Formerly missing people
Missing person cases in Canada
People murdered in British Columbia
Violence against women in Canada
Writers from Vancouver